Airoli (Marathi pronunciation: [əiɾoliː]) is a residential and commercial area of Navi Mumbai in the Indian state of Maharashtra. The name Airoli Node is derived from Airoli-Diva Gaon the largest village prominent in the node node.

It is a part of the Mumbai Metropolitan Region and is administered by Navi Mumbai Municipal Corporation. It is connected to Mulund via Mulund Airoli bridge, to Thane by Kalwa bridge. Also, Thane Belapur Highway Provides well connectivity to Thane & Rest of the Navi Mumbai. Airoli is also a part of extended Palm-Beach Road starting from Ghansoli & ending at Airoli near Dmart. Airoli also gaining a lot of tourist attraction due to Flamingo Boat Rides. 

Airoli Knowledge Park

Airoli Knowledge Park is a Special Economic Zone developed for the IT companies. This is specifically dedicated to the Information Technology Companies and this starts from Airoli, Sec-20 Neva Garden Park Near MSEB Sub-Station Airlo till Mukund Bridge Thane. This entire corridor is developed for IT companies and their dedicated corporate parks. This SEZ consists of companies like Capgemini, Accenture, Wipro & Commercial Office Space providers like Mindspace. Many financial institutes like Axis Bank also have their corporate & operations units here.

Educational facilities

Schools 
 Madhyamik Vidyalaya, Sector-2, Airoli.
 St. Xavier's High School, Airoli
 Phoenix International School and the Lilliputs
 VIBGYOR High School, Airoli
 Zenith International & Petit School
 Radhikabai Meghe Sec. Vidyalaya(Mar.) & Jr. College
 New Horizon Public School and Penguin Kids, Airoli
 New Horizon Scholars School and Neo Kids, Airoli
 Smt. Sushiladevi Deshmukh Pri. Vidyalaya (Eng)
 Sanjivandeep Vidyalaya Airoli
 V.P.M's National Intigration School, Airoli (Kannad)
 Radhikabai Meghe Sec. Vidyalaya (Mar)
 DAV Public School Airoli
 EuroSchool Airoli

 Shriram Vidyalaya, Airoli
 Saraswati Vidyalaya, Airoli
 Datta Meghe High School
 Mazidun High School
 NMMC School, Sector-14, Airoli

Colleges 
 Datta Meghe College of Engineering
 Jnan Vikas Mandal's Mehta Degree College of Arts & Commerce
 Arya Gurukul International Junior College
 New Horizon Institute of Management Studies
 MCT's College of Education & Research
 Smt Sushiladevi Deshmukh Vidyalaya & Jr College
 IISDET's School of Nursing
 Mazidun Jr. College, Airoli

See also

 Airoli Bridge
 Airoli railway station

References

External links

Nodes of Navi Mumbai